This is a list of electoral divisions and wards in the ceremonial county of Warwickshire in the West Midlands. All changes since the re-organisation of local government following the passing of the Local Government Act 1972 are shown. The number of councillors elected for each electoral division or ward is shown in brackets.

County council

Warwickshire
Electoral Divisions from 1 April 1974 (first election 12 April 1973) to 7 May 1981:

Electoral Divisions from 7 May 1981 to 5 May 2005:

Electoral Divisions from 5 May 2005 to 4 May 2017:

† minor boundary changes in 2009

Electoral Divisions from 4 May 2017 to present:

District councils

North Warwickshire
Wards from 1 April 1974 (first election 7 June 1973) to 3 May 1979:

Wards from 3 May 1979 to 1 May 2003:

Wards from 1 May 2003 to present:

Nuneaton and Bedworth
Wards from 1 April 1974 (first election 7 June 1973) to 3 May 1979:

Wards from 3 May 1979 to 2 May 2002:

Wards from 2 May 2002 to present:

Rugby
Wards from 1 April 1974 (first election 7 June 1973) to 3 May 1979:

Wards from 3 May 1979 to 2 May 2002:

Wards from 2 May 2002 to 3 May 2012:

† minor boundary changes in 2007

Wards from 3 May 2012 to present:

† minor boundary changes in 2015

Stratford-on-Avon
Wards from 1 April 1974 (first election 7 June 1973) to 3 May 1979:

Wards from 3 May 1979 to 2 May 2002:

Wards from 2 May 2002 to 7 May 2015:

† minor boundary changes in 2008

Wards from 7 May 2015 to present:

Warwick
Wards from 1 April 1974 (first election 7 June 1973) to 5 May 1983:

Wards from 5 May 1983 to 1 May 2003:

Wards from 1 May 2003 to 7 May 2015:

† minor boundary changes in 2007

Wards from 7 May 2015 to present:

Electoral wards by constituency

Kenilworth and Southam
Abbey, Burton Dassett, Cubbington, Dunchurch and Knightlow, Fenny Compton, Harbury, Kineton, Lapworth, Leam Valley, Leek Wootton, Long Itchington, Park Hill, Radford Semele, Southam, St John's, Stockton and Napton, Stoneleigh, Wellesbourne.

North Warwickshire
Atherstone Central, Atherstone North, Atherstone South and Mancetter, Baddesley and Grendon, Bede, Coleshill North, Coleshill South, Curdworth, Dordon, Exhall, Fillongley, Heath, Hurley and Wood End, Kingsbury, Newton Regis and Warton, Polesworth East, Polesworth West, Poplar, Slough, Water Orton.

Nuneaton
Abbey, Arbury, Arley and Whitacre, Attleborough, Bar Pool, Camp Hill, Galley Common, Hartshill, Kingswood, St Nicolas, Weddington, Wem Brook, Whitestone.

Rugby
Admirals, Avon and Swift, Benn, Bilton, Brownsover North, Brownsover South, Bulkington, Caldecott, Earl Craven and Wolston, Eastlands, Fosse, Hillmorton, Lawford and King's Newnham, New Bilton, Newbold, Overslade, Paddox, Wolvey.

Stratford-on-Avon
Alcester, Aston Cantlow, Bardon, Bidford and Salford, Brailes, Claverdon, Ettington, Henley, Kinwarton, Long Compton, Quinton, Sambourne, Shipston, Snitterfield, Stratford Alveston, Stratford Avenue and New Town, Stratford Guild and Hathaway, Stratford Mount Pleasant, Studley, Tanworth, Tredington, Vale of the Red Horse, Welford.

Warwick and Leamington
Bishop's Tachbrook, Brunswick, Budbrooke, Clarendon, Crown, Manor, Milverton, Warwick North, Warwick South, Warwick West, Whitnash, Willes.

See also
List of parliamentary constituencies in Warwickshire

References

 
Warwickshire